Walter Grundmann (21 October 1906, in Chemnitz – 30 August 1976, in Eisenach) was a German Protestant theologian and antisemitic Nazi and Stasi collaborateur during the Third Reich and GDR. Grundmann served both German dictatorships. He was a member of the Nazi party from 1930 onwards, and from 1933 onwards an active member of the German Christians and prospered as a state-antisemitism supporting theologian and professor for ethnic theology.  In 1939, he was made head of the newly founded Instituts zur Erforschung jüdischen Einflusses auf das deutsche kirchliche Leben in Jena, which was meant to serve state antisemitism by the "Entjudung" (dejudifying) of the Bible and giving antisemitic theological training and arguments for Nazi propaganda.  Despite his past Nazi activities, Grundmann regained some prestige as an evangelic theologian in East Germany; in 1959 he published his comments on the Gospels, which by the 1980s had become standard popular literature. However, Grundmann also prospered as a "Secret Informer" ("Geheimer Informator") to the Ministry for State Security ("Stasi"). He spied on (high ranking) theologians in Eastern and Western Germany. His cover name was GM Berg ("GM Mountain") after the Sermon on the Mount ("Bergrede") to which he referred in his inaugural speech 1939 at the Institute for the Study and Elimination of Jewish Influence on German Church Life, set up under him in Jena.

Life

Training and theological development to 1939

Head of the Institute (1939-1945)

Post-war life

References

Sources
 Susannah Heschel: The theological Faculty at the university of Jena as a Stronghold of national Socialism. In: Feingold, Mordechai: History of Universities, Oxford 2003, S. 143–169.
 Susannah Heschel: The Aryan Jesus. Christian Theologians and the Bible in Nazi Germany. Princeton University Press, 2008,  (Online-Informationen).
  Susannah Heschel: Deutsche Theologen für Hitler. Walter Grundmann und das Eisenacher "Institut zur Erforschung und Beseitigung des jüdischen Einflusses auf das deutsche kirchliche Leben“. In: Jahrbuch 1998/99 zur Geschichte und Wirkung des Holocaust, Darmstadt 1999, S. 147–167.
  Matthias Wolfes: Protestantische Theologie und moderne Welt – Studien zur Geschichte der liberalen Theologie nach 1918, Berlin/New York 1999 (Theologische Bibliothek Töpelmann, Band 102), S. 366–380.
  Roland Deines, Volker Leppin, Karl-Wilhelm Niebuhr (Hrsg.): Walter Grundmann – ein Neutestamentler im Dritten Reich. Leipzig 2007
 Max Weinreich: Hitler's Professors: The Part of Scholarship in Germany's Crimes against the Jewish People. 1. Auflage, New York 1946
  Kurt Meier: Kreuz und Hakenkreuz: Die evangelische Kirche im Dritten Reich. DTB, München 1992
  Birgit Jerke: Wie wurde das Neue Testament zu einem sogenannten Volkstestament "entjudet“? – Aus der Arbeit des Eisenacher "Instituts zur Erforschung und Beseitung des jüdischen Einflusses auf das deutsche kirchliche Leben“. In: Leonore Siegele-Wenschkewitz (Hg.): Christlicher Antijudaismus und Antisemitismus. Theologische und kirchliche Programme Deutscher Christen, Frankfurt am Main 1994, S. 201–234
  Leonore Siegele-Wenschkewitz (Hrsg.): Christlicher Antijudaismus und Antisemitismus. Theologische und kirchliche Programme Deutscher Christen.'' Arnoldshainer Texte, Band 85, Haag + Herchen Verlag,

External links
 
 

1906 births
1976 deaths
Christian fascists
German prisoners of war in World War II held by the Soviet Union
20th-century German Protestant theologians
People from Chemnitz
People from the Kingdom of Saxony
German male non-fiction writers
People of the Stasi